Recetor is a Colombian municipality in the Department of Casanare.

History
Recetor was founded on 17 March, 1740 by Jesuit Missionaries, and was officially made into a municipality in 1925. The first colonists arrived from the department of Boyacá, coming mostly from the municipalities of Miraflores, Berbeo, Paez, and Campohermosa.

Geography
Recetor borders the department of Boyacá, to the east by the municipality of Aguazul, to the south by the municipality of Tauramena and to the southeast by the municipality of Chameza

Economy
The main economic activities are subsistence farming, basic salt mining from wells adjacent to the Recetoreno River, coal mining, and cattle breeding.

Municipalities of Casanare Department